Fayyaz Ahmed (born 28 December 1988) is a Pakistani cricketer. He played in 38 first-class and 20 List A matches between 2004 and 2011. He made his Twenty20 debut on 25 April 2005, for Rawalpindi Rams in the 2004–05 National Twenty20 Cup.

References

External links
 

1988 births
Living people
Pakistani cricketers
Federal Areas cricketers
Islamabad cricketers
Islamabad Leopards cricketers
Rawalpindi cricketers
Rawalpindi Rams cricketers